Bishambar Singh (also Bishamber, 1 October 1940 – 2004) is a retired Indian bantamweight wrestler. In 1966 he won a gold medal at the Commonwealth Games and a bronze at the Asian Games, both in freestyle wrestling. Next year he won a silver medal at the world championships, he is the 1st Indian who won the Silver medal in world wrestling championship. He competed at the 1964 and 1968 Olympics in freestyle and Greco-Roman divisions with the best result of sixth place in freestyle in 1964. The same year he received the Arjuna Award. He should not be confused with fellow wrestlers Bhim Singh and Bishwanath Singh who competed in the same period, but in heavyweight categories.

References

External links
 

1940 births
2004 deaths
Wrestlers at the 1964 Summer Olympics
Wrestlers at the 1968 Summer Olympics
Wrestlers at the 1966 Asian Games
Wrestlers at the 1966 British Empire and Commonwealth Games
Asian Games medalists in wrestling
Medalists at the 1966 Asian Games
Asian Games bronze medalists for India
Commonwealth Games gold medallists for India
Olympic wrestlers of India
Indian male sport wrestlers
World Wrestling Championships medalists
Commonwealth Games medallists in wrestling
Recipients of the Arjuna Award
Medallists at the 1966 British Empire and Commonwealth Games